Conus boutetorum is a species of sea snail, a marine gastropod mollusk in the family Conidae, the cone snails, cone shells or cones.

These snails are predatory and venomous. They are capable of "stinging" humans.

Description

Distribution
This marine species occurs in the Pacific Ocean off Tahiti

References

 Richard G. & Rabiller M. (2013) Conus boutetorum spec. nov., (Mollusca, Gastropoda, Conidae) and notes on the Pionoconus group in French Polynesia. Annales de la Société des Sciences Naturelles de Charente-Maritime 2013, supplement: 53-63
 Puillandre N., Duda T.F., Meyer C., Olivera B.M. & Bouchet P. (2015). One, four or 100 genera? A new classification of the cone snails. Journal of Molluscan Studies. 81: 1-23

External links
 To World Register of Marine Species
 
 Holotype in MNHN, Paris

boutetorum
Gastropods described in 2013